Ly is a digraph of the Latin alphabet, used in Hungarian.

Usage 

Ly is the twentieth letter of the Hungarian alphabet. Its Hungarian name is elipszilon . Now, it can represent the same phoneme  (palatal approximant) as the Hungarian letter j, but historically, it represented the different phoneme  (palatal lateral approximant).

It is used this way only in Hungarian. In Hungarian, even if two characters are put together to make a different sound, they are considered one letter, and even acronyms keep the letter intact.

The combination lj (considered two separate letters, L and J) is also common in Hungarian and is even pronounced  by many speakers. However, even it is sometimes subject to the same reduction to  that ly has been, mainly if it is at the end of a word.

History 

Originally, the digraph letter ly was used to represent the palatal lateral , just as the digraph letter ny is still used to represent the palatal nasal . The Hungarian letter ly came to be pronounced the same as the Hungarian letter j. In the northern dialects, the phoneme  has been preserved.

The digraph ly was also used for the sound  in Croatian alphabet before Gaj's Latin Alphabet was introduced.

Examples 

These examples are Hungarian words that use the letter ly, with the English translation following:

 furulya = flute
 amely = which
helyi = local
golyó = ball
lyuk = hole
kehely = goblet
folyó = river

References 

Latin-script digraphs
Hungarian language